Sri Venugopal (1931 – 10 November 2013) was a Tamil language author of religious pilgrimage travelogues, who also wrote fiction under the name Pushpa Thangadorai.

Works
Some of his most famous novels are: 
 En Peyar Kamala (1974–75)
 Oru Sivappu Villaku Erikirathu (1976)
 Oru Oodhappu Kan Simittugiradhu (1976)

Oru Oodhappu Kan Simittugiradhu was made into a film starring Kamal Haasan.

An excerpt of En Peyar Kamala was translated into English by Pritham K. Chakravarthy and published as part of The Blaft Anthology of Tamil Pulp Fiction in 2008. Volume 2 of The Blaft Anthology of Tamil Pulp Fiction featured Highway 17, a 1980 comic written by Pushpa Thangadorai and illustrated by Jeyaraj, starring a motorcycle-riding female detective called Karate Kavitha.

Some of Pushpa Thangadorai's other short stories and novels are:
 Neen Naan Nila,
 Thenmerku Paruvam,
 Naan Raamanalla,
 Thiruvarangan Ula

References

External links
2005 Review of a Pushpa Thangadorai collection in The Hindu

1931 births
2013 deaths
Tamil-language writers
Indian women novelists
Novelists from Tamil Nadu
20th-century Indian novelists
Women writers from Tamil Nadu
20th-century Indian women writers